This is a list of public art in Carmarthenshire, Wales. This list applies only to works of public art on permanent display in an outdoor public space and does not, for example, include artworks in museums.

Ammanford

Burry Port

Carmarthen

Carmarthen Bay

Eglwyscummin

Llanboidy

Llanelli

Llandovery

Llangynog

Llansadwrn

National Botanic Garden of Wales

Newcastle Emlyn

Pontyberem

References

Carmarthenshire
Carmarthenshire